Tsung (formerly known as idx-Tsunami) is a stress testing tool written in the Erlang language and distributed under the GPL license. It can currently stress test HTTP, WebDAV, LDAP, MySQL, PostgreSQL, SOAP and XMPP servers. Tsung can simulate hundreds of simultaneous users on a single system. It can also function in a clustered environment.

Features 
Features include:

Several IP addresses can be used on a single machine using the underlying OS's IP Aliasing.
OS monitoring (CPU, memory, and network traffic) using SNMP, munin-node agents or Erlang agents on remote servers.
Different types of users can be simulated.
Dynamic sessions can be described in XML (to retrieve, at runtime, an ID from the server output and use it later in the session).
Simulated user thinktimes and the arrival rate can be randomized via probability distribution.
HTML reports can be generated during the load to view response time measurements, server CPU, and other statistics.

References

External links

Tsung Project Page
Load Testing AWS Kinesis
Tsung Information Provided By Process One
Performance Measurement & Applications Benchmarking With Erlang. EUC05

Benchmarks (computing)
Erlang (programming language)
Load testing tools